Enis Đurković (born 24 May 1989) is a Slovenian professional footballer who plays as a forward for Austrian side GSC Liebenfels.

Club career
Đurković started his career with Zarica Kranj from his hometown. As a youngster he moved to another Kranj-based team, Triglav Kranj. In 2012–13, he won the best striker award in the Slovenian PrvaLiga alongside Nikola Nikezić and Marcos Tavares. In summer 2013 it was announced that Đurković signed a contract with Olimpija Ljubljana. In January 2015, Đurković signed a loan deal with Radomlje until the end of the 2014–15 season.

References

External links
 
 NZS profile 
 

1989 births
Living people
Sportspeople from Kranj
Slovenian footballers
Association football forwards
Slovenian expatriate footballers
NK Triglav Kranj players
NK Olimpija Ljubljana (2005) players
NK Radomlje players
NK Celje players
NK Krško players
Slovenian Second League players
Slovenian PrvaLiga players
CS Pandurii Târgu Jiu players
Liga II players
Expatriate footballers in Romania
Slovenian expatriate sportspeople in Romania
Expatriate footballers in Austria
Slovenian expatriate sportspeople in Austria